is a Japanese hurdler and bobsledder. He competed at the 1998 Winter Olympics and the 2002 Winter Olympics.

References

External links
 

1972 births
Living people
Sportspeople from Chiba Prefecture
Japanese male bobsledders
Japanese male hurdlers
Olympic male hurdlers
Olympic bobsledders of Japan
Bobsledders at the 1998 Winter Olympics
Bobsledders at the 2002 Winter Olympics
Japan Championships in Athletics winners